Peter Robert O'Brien (born July 15, 1990) is an American professional baseball left fielder for the Pericos de Puebla of the Mexican League. He previously played in Major League Baseball (MLB) for the Arizona Diamondbacks and Miami Marlins.

Amateur career
O'Brien attended G. Holmes Braddock High School in Miami, Florida. He played for the school's baseball team, and transitioned to catcher during his senior year. Unselected in the 2008 MLB draft, O'Brien chose to enroll at Bethune–Cookman University, where he played college baseball for the Bethune–Cookman Wildcats team in the Mid-Eastern Athletic Conference (MEAC). In 2010, he was named MEAC player of the year. After the 2010 season, he played collegiate summer baseball with the Bourne Braves of the Cape Cod Baseball League.

The Colorado Rockies selected O'Brien in the third round of the 2011 MLB draft, but he opted not to sign, and instead transferred to the University of Miami for his senior year, where he played for the Miami Hurricanes baseball team in the Atlantic Coast Conference (ACC). He was named All-ACC for the 2012 season.

Professional career

New York Yankees
The New York Yankees selected O'Brien in the second round of the 2012 MLB draft, and O'Brien signed with the Yankees. O'Brien started his professional career with the Gulf Coast Yankees and after four games was promoted to the Staten Island Yankees. He finished his first season hitting .212/.256/.401 with 10 home runs and 34 runs batted in. O'Brien started the 2013 season with the Charleston RiverDogs. On June 21, 2013 he was promoted to the Tampa Yankees. After the 2013 season, he competed in the Arizona Fall League.

O'Brien began the 2014 season with the Trenton Thunder of the Class AA Eastern League.

Arizona Diamondbacks
The Yankees traded O'Brien to the Arizona Diamondbacks for Martín Prado on July 31, 2014. The Diamondbacks assigned him to the Mobile BayBears of the Class AA Southern League. After the 2014 season, the Diamondbacks assigned O'Brien to the Arizona Fall League. The Diamondbacks assigned O'Brien to the Reno Aces of the Class AAA Pacific Coast League (PCL) in 2015, and converted him into an outfielder.  On July 14, 2015, O'Brien participated in the Triple A Homerun Derby. He finished in second place with a total of 20 home runs.

O'Brien made his major league debut on September 11, 2015, at Chase Field against the Los Angeles Dodgers. He went 1-for-1 and drove in his first run while pinch hitting for pitcher Enrique Burgos. His first hit was a ground ball single up the middle to center field, coming off of Ian Thomas. He drove in shortstop Nick Ahmed on the hit. O'Brien was designated for assignment by the Diamondbacks on December 23, 2016.

Kansas City Royals
The Diamondbacks traded O'Brien to the Kansas City Royals for minor leaguer Sam Lewis. Following the Royals Spring Training camp, O'Brien was sent back to the minors and briefly played for the Omaha Storm Chasers of the PCL, before he was designated for assignment on May 10, 2017.

Cincinnati Reds
On May 16, 2017, the Cincinnati Reds claimed O'Brien off of waivers and assigned him to the Louisville Bats of the Class AAA International League. He played in five games for Louisville, and was designated for assignment by Cincinnati on May 25.

Texas Rangers
On May 27, 2017, the Texas Rangers claimed O'Brien off waivers. After playing in 16 games for the Triple-A Round Rock Express and Double-A Frisco RoughRiders, O'Brien was again designated for assignment on June 17, 2017 when Ernesto Frieri was selected to the roster.

Los Angeles Dodgers
O'Brien was claimed off waivers by the Los Angeles Dodgers on June 18, 2017. After hitting .219/.297/.465 in 45 games for the Double-A Tulsa Drillers, O'Brien was designated for assignment by the Dodgers on July 31. He was outrighted to the Triple-A Oklahoma City Dodgers on August 3.

Miami Marlins
On May 31, 2018, O'Brien was traded to the Miami Marlins in exchange for cash considerations. O'Brien had his contract selected on September 4, 2018. He hit 4 home runs with 10 RBI in 22 games for the Marlins in 2018. After hitting .167/.255/.262 in 14 games to start the year, on June 20, 2019, O'Brien was designated for assignment. He spent the remainder of the season in Triple-A with the New Orleans Baby Cakes and elected free agency on October 15, 2019.

Atlanta Braves
On December 16, 2019, O'Brien signed a minor league contract with the Atlanta Braves. O’Brien was released by the Braves organization on August 16, 2020.

Toros de Tijuana
On April 27, 2021, O'Brien signed with the Toros de Tijuana of the Mexican League. In 60 games, he hit .258/.303/.554 with 16 home runs and 39 RBIs. O'Brien hit a go-ahead home run in Game 7 of the Serie del Rey, which culminated in a 3–0 win and the Toros' second league championship.

Pericos de Puebla
On December 24, 2021, O'Brien was traded to the Pericos de Puebla of the Mexican League in exchange for a player to be named later.

Personal life
O'Brien was born and raised in Miami Gardens, Florida. His mother, Mercedes, immigrated from Cuba and was a former dancer in the Cuban National Ballet. His father, Terry, is an American former college baseball player. O'Brien is bilingual and learned Spanish as his first language.

References

External links

1990 births
Living people
American sportspeople of Cuban descent
American expatriate baseball players in Mexico
Baseball players from Miami
Major League Baseball left fielders
Arizona Diamondbacks players
Miami Marlins players
Bethune–Cookman Wildcats baseball players
Miami Hurricanes baseball players
Bourne Braves players
Gulf Coast Yankees players
Staten Island Yankees players
Charleston RiverDogs players
Tampa Yankees players
Trenton Thunder players
Mobile BayBears players
Reno Aces players
Omaha Storm Chasers players
Louisville Bats players
Frisco RoughRiders players
Round Rock Express players
Tulsa Drillers players
Yaquis de Obregón players
Jacksonville Jumbo Shrimp players
New Orleans Baby Cakes players
Toros del Este players
American expatriate baseball players in the Dominican Republic
Toros de Tijuana players
Pericos de Puebla players